This is a listing of the horses that finished in either first, second, or third place and the number of starters in the Joe Hirsch Turf Classic Invitational Handicap, an American Grade 1 race for three-year-olds and up at 1½ miles on turf held at Belmont Park in New York.  (List 1977–present)

See also 

 Joe Hirsch Turf Classic Invitational Handicap

References 

Lists of horse racing results
Belmont Park